Dehpagah (also Romanized as Dehpāgāh; also known as Deh Pāgā, Dehpaka, and Paigāb) is a former village in Hamaijan Rural District, Hamaijan District, Sepidan County, Fars Province, Iran. At the 2006 census, its population was 969, in 224 families.  It has since been merged into the city of Hamashahr.

References 

Populated places in Sepidan County
Former populated places in Fars Province